Marsdale is a community in the city of St. Catharines, Ontario, Canada. It borders Regional Road 89 to the north, Lockhart Road, open wasteland to, the south, Highway 406 to the east, and Marsdale Road to the west.

Glenridge is to the north, Brockview to the south, Merritton, Burleigh Hill, Barbican Heights is to the east, and Riverview is to the west.

References

Neighbourhoods in St. Catharines